Petra Davies (24 July 1930 – 22 March 2016) was a British actress.

Early years
Davies was born in Eltham, London, England on 24 July 1930 and grew up in Newport, Wales. Her parents were Welsh. She trained at the Royal Academy of Dramatic Art 1947 – 1949.

Career
Davies had many television appearances and had worked in films and theatre. Her TV roles included appearances in Vanity Fair, Precious Bane, Destination Downing Street, Emma, Melissa, ITV Play of the Week, Dolly, The Saint, Z-Cars, Crown Court and General Hospital. Her films have included Four Days (1951), Operation Amsterdam (1959), The Silent Invasion (1962) and Two Letter Alibi (1962).

Davies' last appearance was in an episode of The Ruth Rendell Mysteries.

Personal life
Davies was married to the actor Jack May from 1957 until his death in 1997.

Death
Davies died on 22 March 2016 in Abbey Wood, London, England. She was survived by her two children, Henrietta and David.

References

External links
 
 Obituary – The Stage

2016 deaths
British actresses
1930 births
Actresses from London
Alumni of RADA